Rajya Sabha elections were held in 1982, to elect members of the Rajya Sabha, Indian Parliament's upper chamber.

Elections
Elections were held in 1982 to elect members from various states.
The list is incomplete.

Members elected
The following members are elected in the elections held in 1982. They are members for the term 1982-88 and retire in year 1982, except in case of the resignation or death before the term.

State - Member - Party

Bye-elections
The following bye elections were held in the year 1982.

State - Member - Party

 Nominated -  Prof Asima Chatterjee  - NOM  (  ele  18/02/1982 term till 1984 )
 Nominated -  V C Ganesan  - INC  (  ele  18/02/1982 term till 1984 )

References

1982 elections in India
1982